Godawari Dutta is an Indian painter, well known for Madhubani Painting and patron of Mithila Kala Vikas Samiti. She was awarded India's fourth highest civilian award the Padma Shri.

Personal life 
Godawari Dutta was born in the mid-1920 in Bahadurpur village, Darbhanga district, Bihar, India, she was taught painting by her mother, Subhadra Devi, who herself was an artist.
At only 10 years old Dutta lost her father. Together with her three siblings she was brought up by her mother. 
Godavari Dutta got married in 1947 and she gave birth to a son whom she had to raise by herself.

Social commitment 
Godawari Dutta founded the Mithila Kala Viaks Samiti on December 21, 1983, an NGO that aims fight poverty and to promote Madhubani Painting and by training women in the art, and provide a basic education. 
The organization is engaged in designing and implementing programmes for disadvantaged communities.

In doing so Dutta has involved village women in Mithila painting and helped them to be financially independent. She also formed a village committee to promote girls’ education.

Work and career 
Dutta started at six years old with paintings on walls and started to use paper only in 1971. Dutta is well versed in the Kayashta style of Mithila paintings that favours black and white contrasts. Unlike other artists, she uses bamboo sticks to paint. Reoccurring themes of her art are the portrayal of characters from Ramayana and Mahabharata, as well as events of daily life like marriage or dance.
Godavari Dutta has trained teachers, as well as students under the government scheme “Center for cultural resources and training”.

Dutta has been to Germany and Japan. In total she visited Japan seven times, where she stayed for six months a year. A set of works which she created during that time is now owned by the Mithila Museum in Takomachi, Japan, and in the Fukuoka Asian Art Museum, Japan.

Awards 

 National Award 1980
 Shilp Guru in 2006
 Padma Shri Award in 2019

References

External links 

 Documentary by Doordarshan on YouTube (in Hindi)
 Interview with Folkartopedia on YouTube (in Hindi)

Indian women painters
Year of birth missing (living people)
Living people
Place of birth missing (living people)
Recipients of the Padma Shri in arts